The men's 20 kilometres walk at the 2003 All-Africa Games were held on October 12.

Results

References
Results
Results

20